Stratton Hills are rounded mountains, about 3 nautical miles (6 km) long and rising to 850 m, forming the south wall of Ferrar Glazier between Overflow Glacier and the vicinity of Bettle Peak, in Victoria Land. Named by the New Zealand Antarctic Place-Names Committee (NZ-APC) at the suggestion of R.H. Findlay, New Zealand Antarctic Research Program (NZARP) geologist in the area between 1977 and 1981, after Winthrop Scott Stratton, a New Zealand carpenter who achieved a fortune and devoted most of it to philanthropic causes.

Mountains of Victoria Land
Scott Coast